Paulo Cezár Dos Santos Bunze (Greek: Σάντος Πάολο  born 19 July 1988) is an Angolan-Portuguese professional footballer who is currently under contract to Zwekapin United of the Myanmar National League. He is able to represent Angola internationally and plays as a midfielder. Besides Portugal, he has played in England, Latvia, Greece and Myanmar.

Career

Latvia
One of Jurmala's new imports for 2013, Bunze claimed that the gameplay there was more bellicose and less technical.

Greece
Impressing Apollon Kalamata in January 2016, his previous club PAS Korinthos disputed Apollon's transfer claim of the Angolan-Portuguese attacker, explaining that he was still representing them in competitions. Eventually, Bunze became part of Apollon, picking up a three-match suspension in March before joining AE Pellanas Kastoriou succeeding a failed deal with Tsiklitiras Pylos.

References

External links
 Paulo Bunze at playmakerstats.com (English version of ceroacero.es)
 at Fieldoo
 Laconia Football League Profile
 

Portuguese sportspeople of Angolan descent
Portuguese expatriate footballers
Living people
Association football forwards
Expatriate footballers in England
Expatriate soccer players in the United States
Myanmar National League players
FC Jūrmala players
Zwegabin United F.C. players
Angolan footballers
Portuguese footballers
Angolan expatriate footballers
Expatriate footballers in Greece
Waltham Forest F.C. players
Expatriate footballers in Myanmar
Expatriate footballers in Latvia
1988 births
Portuguese expatriate sportspeople in England